Jeremy Adam Eichler (born 13 August 1974) is an American music critic, and cultural historian. Since 2006 he has been the chief classical music critic of The Boston Globe, frequently writing in his column the "Third Ear". Having written for a variety of newspaper publications, Eichler has received numerous awards and fellowships. His forthcoming book, Time's Echo, explores music and the cultural memory of the Second World War.

Life and career
Jeremy Adam Eichler was born on 13 August 1974. Growing up in Newton, Massachusetts, he played violin and viola in his youth, playing the latter in youth orchestras. He received an undergraduate degree from Brown University, where he co-founded the Nahanni String Quartet.

In 2003 Eichler began writing music criticism for The New York Times, including reviews and features. He then succeeded Richard Dyer as chief classical music critic of The Boston Globe in 2006, where Eichler continues to write daily. According to the musicologist Andrea F. Bohlman in Grove Music Online, he "draws attention to local performers and the city’s conservatory students alongside more established musicians". Eichler find music criticism a continuously challenging and demanding practice, but credits this as its appeal. His concert reviews often both narrate and review the event in question and in doing so they promote the merit of live performances. At the Globe Eichler also writes his own column, "Third Ear", which connects "music with broader worlds of history, politics, and culture."

He has contributed to a multitude of other publications, including the Los Angeles Times, The Nation, The New Republic, The New Yorker, Slate, the Washington Post and Vanity Fair. ASCAP awarded him the Deems Taylor Award for Music Criticism in 2013. He has received a fellowship from the Center for Jewish History, a grant from the German Academic Exchange Service and has taught at Brandeis University. He was also a fellow at the Radcliffe Institute for Advanced Studies of Harvard University and the National Endowment for the Humanities named him a "public scholar" in 2018. He is also a cultural historian.

Eichler subsequently relocated to New York, where he earned a doctorate in history from Columbia University; his doctoral dissertation was on the composer Arnold Schoenberg. Published in 2015, the topic in discussion was Schoenberg's A Survivor from Warsaw, a large-scale cantata that was the earliest Holocaust musical memorial from a major composer. His dissertation won the Columbia University's Salo and Jeanette Baron Prize for Jewish Studies. Eichler is currently writing a book, entitled The Echo of Time, which examines the "relationship of cultural memory and music composed in the wake of the Second World War". Among the works to be discussed are Benjamin Britten's War Requiem, Dmitri Shostakovich's Symphony No. 13, Babi Yar and Metamorphosen by Richard Strauss. It will be published by Alfred A. Knopf and Faber and Faber in North America and the United Kingdom respectively. He is fellow at MacDowell, an artists' residency and workshop where he has worked on the publication.

Selected publications

 
 
  Reprinted as "Beethoven wandering" on Eichler's website.

References

Further reading

External links
 
 Articles by Jeremy Eichler in The Boston Globe
 Articles by Jeremy Eichler in The New York Times
 Jeremy Eichler's column, the "Third Ear",  in The Boston Globe
 
 
 Profile for Jeremy Eichler on Boston.com

1974 births
Living people
American music critics
Classical music critics
The Boston Globe people
Brown University alumni
Columbia University alumni